Gemma Bovery is a 2014 French comedy-drama film based on Posy Simmonds' 1999 graphic novel of the same name. Directed by Anne Fontaine, the film stars Gemma Arterton, Jason Flemyng, Mel Raido and Fabrice Luchini. The film premiered at the 2014 Festival du Film Francophone d'Angoulême on 24 August 2014, and showed in the Special Presentations section at the Toronto International Film Festival on 6 September 2014.

Plot
Martin (Fabrice Luchini), an ex-Parisian with a deep appreciation for Gustave Flaubert, has settled in a village in Normandy as a baker. He sees a British couple moving into an old property across the road. Their names, Gemma (Gemma Arterton) and Charles Bovery (Jason Flemyng), echo those of the leading characters in Flaubert's 1856 masterpiece Madame Bovary. Martin engages with the young couple and observes that Gemma's behaviour replicates that of her namesake, including romantic and sexual liaisons that suggest she is headed for a tragic finale like that of the novel. He intervenes but cannot alter the inevitable.

Cast

 Fabrice Luchini as Martin Joubert
 Gemma Arterton as Gemma Bovery
 Jason Flemyng as Charlie Bovery, Gemma's new husband
 Mel Raido as Patrick, Gemma's ex-boyfriend and a charming food critic
 Isabelle Candelier as Valérie Joubert
 Niels Schneider as Hervé de Bressigny
 Elsa Zylberstein as Wizzy
 Pip Torrens as Rankin
 Kacey Mottet Klein as Julien Joubert
 Édith Scob as Madame de Bressigny
 Pascale Arbillot as The new neighbor

Production

Pre-production
Anne Fontaine confirmed in early 2013 that she would direct the film with Philippe Carcassonne and Faye Ward producing it.

Filming
Principal photography took place in the summer and autumn of 2013 in France.

Reception
, the film holds a 54% approval rating on review aggregation website Rotten Tomatoes, based on 90 reviews, with an average score of 5.99/10. The site's consensus reads, "Gemma Boverys bursts of charm -- among them Gemma Arterton's winsome performance in the title role -- are often enough to compensate for its lack of focus.". At Metacritic, which assigns a normalized rating out of 100 to reviews from mainstream critics, the film received an average score of 58, based on 27 reviews, indicating "mixed or average reviews".

References

External links

 
 
 
 

2014 films
2010s French-language films
2010s English-language films
2014 comedy-drama films
British comedy-drama films
French comedy-drama films
Films based on British comics
Films based on comic strips
Films based on British novels
Films directed by Anne Fontaine
Films set in France
Films shot in France
Gaumont Film Company films
Live-action films based on comics
English-language French films
Films scored by Bruno Coulais
2010s British films
2010s French films